Leventikos (Levéntikos); or Bufčansko, also known as Litós (Λιτός), Kucano, Nešo or Pusteno, is a dance of western Macedonia, mainly performed by ethnic Macedonians and Greeks in the town of Florina, Greece and in the Resen and Bitola regions in the neighbouring North Macedonia.

Reflecting the dance steps: slow-quick-quick-slow-quick, the meter comprises five beats of varying length but these lengths come in different variations: 
The third (second ) beat may be lengthened relative to its written value in both variations but less so at higher speeds. The last (third ) beat may be shortened, a common Balkan treatment of meters.  

The  meter appears in traditional Northern and Southern Albanian ballads, in dance tunes such as Berace, and in Macedonian dances such as Beranče, Bajrače and Bufčansko (Macedonian: Буфчанско; also called Bufskoto or Bufsko).

The Levendikos dance performed in Petroussa is very different from the one in Florina.

In popular culture
 The Buvčansko theme can also be heard as part of Macedon's theme in Civilization VI.

See also
Macedonian music
Greek dances
Greek folk music
Hora (dance)

External links
 Cultural Change in Traditional Dances in Florina, Greece
 Play or download the music of Zensko Berance
 Play or download the music for Levendikos and Pusteno
 Dance description (in Greek) of the Poustseno
 Radio Banitsa frequently plays variations of the Poustseno and the 3+2+2+3+2 rhythm

Greek dances
Greek music
European folk dances
Macedonian dances